George Roger Waters (born 6 September 1943) is an English musician, singer-songwriter and composer. In 1965, he co-founded the progressive rock band Pink Floyd as the bassist. Following the departure of singer-songwriter Syd Barrett in 1968, Waters also became the band's lyricist, co-lead vocalist and conceptual leader until his departure in 1985.

Pink Floyd achieved international success with the concept albums The Dark Side of the Moon (1973), Wish You Were Here (1975), Animals (1977), The Wall (1979), and The Final Cut (1983). By the early 1980s, they had become one of the most critically acclaimed and commercially successful groups in popular music. Amid creative differences, Waters left in 1985 and began a legal dispute over the use of the band's name and material. They settled out of court in 1987. Waters's solo work includes the studio albums The Pros and Cons of Hitch Hiking (1984), Radio K.A.O.S. (1987), Amused to Death (1992), and Is This the Life We Really Want? (2017). In 2005, he released , an opera translated from Étienne and Nadine Roda-Gils' libretto about the French Revolution.

In 1990, Waters staged one of the largest rock concerts in history, The Wall – Live in Berlin, with an attendance of 450,000. As a member of Pink Floyd, he was inducted into the US Rock and Roll Hall of Fame in 1996 and the UK Music Hall of Fame in 2005. Later that year, he reunited with Pink Floyd for the Live 8 global awareness event, the group's only appearance with Waters since 1981. He has toured extensively as a solo act since 1999; he performed The Dark Side of the Moon in its entirety for his world tour of 2006–2008, and the Wall Live tour of 2010–2013 was the highest-grossing tour by a solo artist at the time.

Waters incorporates political themes in his work and has drawn controversy for his views. He is a supporter of Palestine in the Israeli–Palestinian conflict, likening the treatment of Palestine by Israel to Nazi Germany, and has been accused of antisemitism by organisations including the Anti-Defamation League, which he denies.

Early years
Waters was born on 6 September 1943, the younger of two boys, to Mary (née Whyte; 1913–2009) and Eric Fletcher Waters (1914–1944), in Great Bookham, Surrey. His father, the son of a coal miner and Labour Party activist, was a schoolteacher, a devout Christian, and a Communist Party member.

In the early years of the Second World War, Waters's father was a conscientious objector who drove an ambulance during the Blitz. He later changed his stance on pacifism, joined the Territorial Army and was commissioned into the 8th Battalion, Royal Fusiliers as a Second Lieutenant on 11 September 1943. He was killed five months later on 18 February 1944 at Aprilia, during the Battle of Anzio, when Roger was five months old. He is commemorated in Aprilia and at the Cassino War Cemetery. On 18 February 2014, Waters unveiled a monument to his father and other war casualties in Aprilia, Italy and was made an honorary citizen of Anzio. Following her husband's death, Mary Waters, also a teacher, moved with her two sons to Cambridge and raised them there. Waters's earliest memory is of the V-J Day celebrations.

Waters attended Morley Memorial Junior School in Cambridge and then the Cambridgeshire High School for Boys (now Hills Road Sixth Form College) with Syd Barrett. The future Pink Floyd guitarist David Gilmour lived nearby on Mill Road and attended the Perse School. At 15, Waters was chairman of the Cambridge Youth Campaign for Nuclear Disarmament (YCND), having designed its publicity poster and participated in its organisation. He was a keen sportsman and a highly regarded member of the high school's cricket and rugby teams. Waters was unhappy at school, saying: "I hated every second of it, apart from games. The regime at school was a very oppressive one ... The same kids who are susceptible to bullying by other kids are also susceptible to bullying by the teachers."

Waters met future the Pink Floyd members Nick Mason and Richard Wright in London at the Regent Street Polytechnic (later the University of Westminster) school of architecture. Waters enrolled there in 1962, after a series of aptitude tests indicated he was well suited to that field. He had initially considered a career in mechanical engineering.

1965–1985: Pink Floyd

Formation and Barrett-led period

By September 1963, Waters and Mason had lost interest in their studies and moved into the lower flat of Stanhope Gardens, owned by Mike Leonard, a part-time tutor at the Regent Street Polytechnic. Waters, Mason and Wright first played music together in late 1963, in a band formed by vocalist Keith Noble and bassist Clive Metcalfe. They usually called themselves Sigma 6, but also used the name the Meggadeaths. Waters played rhythm guitar and Mason played drums, Wright played any keyboard he could arrange to use, and Noble's sister Sheilagh provided occasional vocals. In the early years the band performed during private functions and rehearsed in a tearoom in the basement of Regent Street Polytechnic.

When Metcalfe and Noble left to form their own group in September 1963, the remaining members asked Barrett and the guitarist Bob Klose to join. Waters switched to the bass. By January 1964, the group became known as the Abdabs, or the Screaming Abdabs. During late 1964, the band used the names Leonard's Lodgers, Spectrum Five, and eventually, the Tea Set. In late 1965, the Tea Set had changed their name to the Pink Floyd Sound, later the Pink Floyd Blues Band and, by early 1966, Pink Floyd.

By early 1966, Barrett was Pink Floyd's frontman, guitarist, and songwriter. He wrote or co-wrote all but one track of their debut LP The Piper at the Gates of Dawn, released in August 1967. Waters contributed the song "Take Up Thy Stethoscope and Walk" (his first sole writing credit) to the album. By late 1967, Barrett's deteriorating mental health and increasingly erratic behaviour, rendered him "unable or unwilling" to continue in his capacity as Pink Floyd's singer-songwriter and lead guitarist. In early March 1968, to discuss the band's future, Barrett, Mason, Waters, and Wright met with the band's managers, Peter Jenner and Andrew King of the rock music management company they had all founded: Blackhill Enterprises. Barrett agreed to leave Pink Floyd, and the band "agreed to Blackhill's entitlement in perpetuity" regarding "past activities". Their new manager, Steve O'Rourke, made a formal announcement about the departure of Barrett and the arrival of Gilmour in April 1968.

Waters-led period

After Barrett's departure in March 1968, Waters began to chart Pink Floyd's artistic direction. In 1970, he composed – in collaboration with Ron Geesin –  Music from The Body, a soundtrack for Roy Battersby's documentary The Body.

Waters said he wanted to "drag [Pink Floyd] kicking and screaming back from the borders of space, from the whimsy that Syd was into, to my concerns, which were much more political and philosophical". He became a dominant songwriter and the band's principal lyricist, sharing lead vocals with Gilmour and sometimes Wright. Throughout the late 1970s, he was the band's dominant creative figure until his departure in 1985. He wrote most of the lyrics to the five Pink Floyd albums preceding his departure, starting with The Dark Side of the Moon (1973) and ending with The Final Cut (1983), while exerting progressively more creative control. Every Waters studio album from The Dark Side of the Moon onwards has been a concept album.

With lyrics entirely by Waters, The Dark Side of the Moon is one of the most successful rock albums ever. It spent 736 consecutive weeks on the Billboard 200 chart—until July 1988—and sold over 40 million copies worldwide. As of 2005, it continued to sell over 8,000 copies a week. According to Pink Floyd biographer Glenn Povey, Dark Side of the Moon is the world's second-bestselling album and the United States' 21st-bestselling album.

In 2006, asked if he felt his goals for Dark Side had been accomplished, Waters said: 

Waters's thematic ideas became the impetus for the concept albums The Dark Side of the Moon (1973), Wish You Were Here (1975), Animals (1977) and The Wall (1979) — written largely by Waters — and The Final Cut (1983), written entirely by him. The cost of war and the loss of his father became a recurring theme, from "Corporal Clegg" (A Saucerful of Secrets, 1968) and "Free Four" (Obscured by Clouds, 1972) to "Us and Them" from The Dark Side of the Moon, "When the Tigers Broke Free", first used in the feature film, The Wall (1982), later included with "The Fletcher Memorial Home" on The Final Cut, an album dedicated to his father. The theme and composition of The Wall was influenced by his upbringing in an English society depleted of men after the Second World War.

The Wall, written almost entirely by Waters, is largely based on his life story. Having sold over 23 million RIAA certified units in the US as of 2013, is tied for sixth-most certified album of all time in America. Pink Floyd hired Bob Ezrin to co-produce the album and cartoonist Gerald Scarfe to illustrate the sleeve art. They embarked on The Wall Tour of Los Angeles, New York, London, and Dortmund. The last Pink Floyd performance of The Wall was on 17 June 1981, at Earls Court London, and this was Pink Floyd's last appearance with Waters until the band's brief reunion at 2 July 2005 Live 8 concert in London's Hyde Park, 24 years later.

In March 1983, the last Pink Floyd album with Waters, The Final Cut, was released. It was subtitled: "A requiem for the post-war dream by Roger Waters, performed by Pink Floyd". Waters wrote all the album's lyrics and music. His lyrics were critical of the Conservative Party government of the day and mention Prime Minister Margaret Thatcher by name. At the time Gilmour did not have any new material, so he asked Waters to delay the recording until he could write some songs, but Waters refused. According to Mason, after power struggles within the band and creative arguments about the album, Gilmour's name "disappeared" from the production credits, though he retained his pay. Rolling Stone magazine gave the album five stars, with Kurt Loder describing it as "a superlative achievement" and "art rock's crowning masterpiece". Loder viewed the work as "essentially a Roger Waters solo album".

Departure and legal battles
Amidst creative differences, Waters left Pink Floyd in 1985 and began a legal battle with the band regarding their continued use of the name and material. In December 1985, Waters issued a statement to EMI and CBS invoking the "Leaving Member" clause in his contract. In October 1986, he initiated High Court proceedings to formally dissolve the Pink Floyd partnership. In his submission to the High Court he called Pink Floyd a "spent force creatively". Gilmour and Mason opposed the application and announced their intention to continue as Pink Floyd. Waters said he had been forced to resign like Barrett had been years earlier, and decided to leave Pink Floyd based on legal considerations, saying: "If I hadn't, the financial repercussions would have wiped me out completely."

Waters did not want the band to use the name Pink Floyd without him. He said later: "I would be distressed if Paul McCartney and Ringo Starr made records and went on the road calling themselves the Beatles. If John Lennon's not in it, it's sacrilegious ... To continue with Gilmour and Mason, getting in a whole bunch of other people to write the material, seems to me an insult to the work that came before." In December 1987, Waters and Pink Floyd reached an agreement. Waters was released from his contractual obligation with O'Rourke, and he retained the copyrights to the Wall concept and the inflatable Animals pig. Pink Floyd released three studio albums without him: A Momentary Lapse of Reason (1987), The Division Bell (1994) and The Endless River (2014). According to a 1999 interview with Gilmour, Waters declined an invitation to perform The Dark Side of the Moon with Pink Floyd at Earls Court, London. 

In 2005, Waters said the period of his departure had been a "bad, negative time", and that he regretted his part in the negativity: "Why should I have imposed my feeling about the work and what it was worth on the others if they didn't feel the same? I was wrong in attempting to do that." In 2013, Waters said he regretted the lawsuit and had failed to appreciate that the Pink Floyd name had commercial value independent of the band members.

1984–present: solo career

1984–1989: The Pros and Cons of Hitch Hiking and Radio K.A.O.S. 

In 1984, Waters released his first solo album, The Pros and Cons of Hitch Hiking, which dealt with Waters's feelings about monogamy and family life versus "the call of the wild". The protagonist, Reg, finally chooses love and matrimony over promiscuity. The album featured guitarist Eric Clapton, jazz saxophonist David Sanborn, and artwork by Gerald Scarfe. Kurt Loder described The Pros And Cons of Hitch Hiking as a "strangely static, faintly hideous record". Rolling Stone rated the album a "rock bottom one star". Years later, Mike DeGagne of AllMusic praised its "ingenious symbolism" and "brilliant use of stream of consciousness within a subconscious realm", rating it four out of five.

Waters toured the album with Clapton, a new band, and new material; the shows included a selection of Pink Floyd songs. Waters débuted his tour in Stockholm on 16 June 1984. The tour drew poor ticket sales and some performances at larger venues were cancelled; Waters estimated that he lost £400,000 on the tour. In March 1985, Waters went to North America to play smaller venues with the Pros and Cons Plus Some Old Pink Floyd Stuff—North America Tour 1985. The Pros and Cons of Hitch Hiking has been certified Gold by the RIAA.

In 1986, Waters contributed songs and a score to the soundtrack of the animated film When the Wind Blows, based on the Raymond Briggs book of the same name. His backing band featuring Paul Carrack was credited as The Bleeding Heart Band. In 1987, Waters released Radio K.A.O.S., a concept album based on a mute man named Billy from an impoverished Welsh mining town who has the ability to physically tune into radio waves in his head. Billy learns to communicate with a radio DJ, and eventually to control the world's computers. Angry at the state of the world in which he lives, he simulates a nuclear attack. Waters followed the release with a supporting tour also in 1987.

1989–1999: The Wall – Live in Berlin and Amused to Death 
In November 1989, the Berlin Wall fell, and in July 1990 Waters staged one of the largest and most elaborate rock concerts in history, The Wall – Live in Berlin, on the vacant terrain between Potsdamer Platz and the Brandenburg Gate. The show reported an attendance of 200,000, though some estimates are as much as twice that, with approximately one billion television viewers. Leonard Cheshire asked Waters to perform the concert to raise funds for charity. Waters's musicians included Joni Mitchell, Van Morrison, Cyndi Lauper, Bryan Adams, Scorpions, and Sinéad O'Connor. Waters also used an East German symphony orchestra and choir, a Soviet marching band, and a pair of helicopters from the US 7th Airborne Command and Control Squadron. Designed by Mark Fisher, the wall was 25 metres tall and 170 metres long and was built across the set, and Scarfe's inflatable puppets were recreated on an enlarged scale. Many rock icons received invitations to the show, though Gilmour, Mason, and Wright did not. Waters released a double album of the performance, which has been certified platinum by the RIAA.

In 1990, Waters hired manager Mark Fenwick and left EMI for a worldwide deal with Columbia. He released his third studio album, Amused to Death, in 1992. The record was influenced heavily by the events of the Tiananmen Square protests of 1989 and the Gulf War, and a critique of the notion of war becoming the subject of entertainment, particularly on television. The title was derived from the book Amusing Ourselves to Death by Neil Postman. Patrick Leonard, who worked on A Momentary Lapse of Reason, co-produced the album. Jeff Beck played lead guitar on many of the album's tracks, which were recorded with a cast of musicians at ten different recording studios. It is Waters's most critically acclaimed solo recording, garnering comparison to his work with Pink Floyd. Waters described the record as a "stunning piece of work", ranking it alongside Dark Side of the Moon and The Wall as one of the best of his career. The song "What God Wants, Pt. 1" reached number 35 in the UK in September 1992 and number 5 on Billboards Mainstream Rock Tracks chart in the US. Amused to Death was certified Silver by the British Phonographic Industry. Sales of Amused to Death topped out at around one million and there was no tour in support of the album. Waters would first perform material from it seven years later during his In the Flesh tour. In 1996, Waters was inducted into the US and UK Rock and Roll Halls of Fame as a member of Pink Floyd.

1999–2004: In the Flesh tour and Wall Broadway production
In 1999, after a 12-year hiatus from touring and a seven-year absence from the music industry, Waters embarked on the In the Flesh tour, performing both solo and Pink Floyd material. The tour was a financial success in the US; though Waters had booked mostly smaller venues, tickets sold so well that many of the concerts were upgraded to larger ones. The tour eventually stretched across the world and spanned three years. A concert film was released on CD and DVD, In the Flesh – Live. During the tour, Waters played two new songs "Flickering Flame" and "Each Small Candle" as the final encore to many of the shows. In June 2002, he completed the tour with a performance in front of 70,000 people at the Glastonbury Festival of Performing Arts, playing 15 Pink Floyd songs and five songs from his solo catalogue.

Miramax announced in 2004 that a production of The Wall was to appear on Broadway with Waters playing a prominent role in the creative direction. Reports stated that the musical contained not only the original tracks from The Wall, but also songs from Dark Side of the Moon, Wish You Were Here and other Pink Floyd albums, as well as new material. On the night of 1 May 2004, recorded extracts from the opera, including its overture, were played on the occasion of the Welcome Europe celebrations in the accession country of Malta. Gert Hof mixed recorded excerpts from the opera into a continuous piece of music which was played as an accompaniment to a large light and fireworks display over Grand Harbour in Valletta. In July 2004, Waters released two new tracks online: "To Kill the Child", inspired by the 2003 invasion of Iraq, and "Leaving Beirut", an anti-war song inspired by his travels in the Middle East as a teenager.

2005: Pink Floyd reunion and   

In July 2005, Waters reunited with Mason, Wright, and Gilmour for their final performance together at the 2005 Live 8 concert in London's Hyde Park, Pink Floyd's only appearance with Waters since their final performance of The Wall at Earls Court London 24 years earlier. They played a 23-minute set consisting of "Speak to Me/Breathe"/"Breathe (Reprise)", "Money", "Wish You Were Here", and "Comfortably Numb". Waters told the Associated Press that while the experience of playing with Pink Floyd again was positive, the chances of a bona fide reunion would be "slight" considering his and Gilmour's continuing musical and ideological differences. Though Waters had differing ideas about which songs they should play, he "agreed to roll over for one night only". In November 2005, Pink Floyd were inducted into the UK Music Hall of Fame by Pete Townshend of the Who.

In September 2005, Waters released  (pronounced , French for "it will be fine"; Waters added the subtitle, "There is Hope"), an opera in three acts translated from the late Étienne Roda-Gil's French libretto based on the historical subject of the French Revolution.  was released as a double CD album, featuring baritone Bryn Terfel, soprano Ying Huang and tenor Paul Groves. Set during the early French Revolution, the original libretto was co-written in French by Roda-Gil and his wife Nadine Delahaye. Waters had begun rewriting the libretto in English in 1989, and said about the composition: "I've always been a big fan of Beethoven's choral music, Berlioz and Borodin ... This is unashamedly romantic and resides in that early 19th-century tradition, because that's where my tastes lie in classical and choral music." Waters appeared on television to discuss the opera, but the interviews often focused on his relationship with Pink Floyd, something Waters would "take in stride", a sign Pink Floyd biographer Mark Blake believes is "a testament to his mellower old age or twenty years of dedicated psychotherapy".  reached number 5 on the Billboard Classical Music Chart in the United States.

2006–2009: The Dark Side of the Moon Live 
In June 2006, Waters began the two-year Dark Side of the Moon Live world tour. The first half of the show featured both Pink Floyd songs and Waters's solo material; the second included a complete performance of The Dark Side of the Moon, the first time in more than three decades that Waters had performed it. The shows ended with an encore from the third side of The Wall. The elaborate staging, by the concert lighting designer Marc Brickman, included laser lights, fog machines, pyrotechnics, psychedelic projections, and inflatable floating puppets (Spaceman and Pig) controlled by a "handler" dressed as a butcher, and a full 360-degree quadraphonic sound system. Mason joined Waters for the Dark Side of the Moon set and the encores on some 2006 performances.

In March 2007, the Waters song "Hello (I Love You)" featured in the science fiction film The Last Mimzy. Waters released it as a single, on CD and via download, and described it as "a song that captures the themes of the movie, the clash between humanity's best and worst instincts, and how a child's innocence can win the day". He performed at California's Coachella Festival in April 2008 and was to be among the headlining artists at Live Earth 2008 in Mumbai, India, in December 2008, but the concert was cancelled following the 26 November terrorist attacks in Mumbai. In April 2008, Waters discussed a possible new album with the tentative name Heartland.

2010s: The Wall Live and Is This the Life We Really Want? 
In June 2010, Waters released a cover of "We Shall Overcome", a protest song rewritten and arranged by Guy Carawan and Pete Seeger. He performed with Gilmour at the Hoping Foundation Benefit Evening in July 2010. The set comprised a cover of the Phil Spector song "To Know Him Is to Love Him", which was played in early Pink Floyd soundchecks, followed by "Wish You Were Here", "Comfortably Numb", and "Another Brick in the Wall (Part Two)".

In September 2010, Waters began the Wall Live tour, an updated version of the original Pink Floyd tour, featuring a complete performance of The Wall. Waters said the tour would likely be his last: "I'm not as young as I used to be. I'm not like B.B. King, or Muddy Waters. I'm not a great vocalist or a great instrumentalist or whatever, but I still have the fire in my belly, and I have something to say. I have a swan song in me and I think this will probably be it."

At the O2 Arena in London on 12 May 2011, Gilmour and Mason again performed with Waters on "Comfortably Numb", and "Outside the Wall". For the first half of 2012, the tour topped worldwide concert ticket sales, having sold more than 1.4 million tickets globally. By 2013, the Wall Live had become the highest-grossing tour by a solo artist. Waters performed at the Concert for Sandy Relief at Madison Square Garden on 12 December 2012. On 24 July 2015, he headlined the Newport Folk Festival in Newport, Rhode Island, accompanied by the band My Morning Jacket and two singers from the group Lucius. Waters performed at the Desert Trip festival in October 2016.

Waters released his first solo album in nearly 25 years, Is This the Life We Really Want?, on 2 June 2017. It was produced by the Radiohead producer Nigel Godrich. Godrich was a fan of Waters' work with Pink Floyd, but was critical of his solo work and encouraged him to make a concise album showcasing his lyrics. Waters returned to North America in 2017 with the Us + Them Tour, performing Pink Floyd and solo material.

On 26 October 2018, Sony Classical Masterworks released an adaptation of Igor Stravinsky's theatrical work The Soldier's Tale narrated by Waters. On 18 April 2019, Waters joined Nick Mason's Saucerful of Secrets on stage at the Beacon Theatre to sing "Set the Controls for the Heart of the Sun". Waters was one of the ten highest-grossing concert acts of the decade.

2020s: This is Not a Drill and further Pink Floyd disputes 
In January 2020, Waters announced a new arena tour, This Is Not a Drill, that would tour North America and finish one month before the 2020 presidential election. The tour was rescheduled to 2022 due to the COVID-19 pandemic. The concerts were held from July to October 2022, and expanded with dates in Europe from March to June 2023. In 2021, Waters said he had begun writing a memoir during the pandemic. In December 2022, he released an EP, The Lockdown Sessions, comprising six new versions of songs from his solo career and Pink Floyd.

Waters continued to quarrel with Gilmour. In 2021, Waters wrote publicly of their disputes over Pink Floyd reissues and credits, accusing Gilmour of distorting the truth, and complained that Gilmour would not allow him to use Pink Floyd's website and social media channels. Rolling Stone noted that Waters and Gilmour "seem to have hit yet another low point in their relationship".

In early 2023, Waters gave an interview in which he refused to condemn Russia's invasion of Ukraine and criticised Pink Floyd's 2022 track "Hey, Hey, Rise Up!", which was released in support of Ukraine. Shortly afterwards, Polly Samson, the wife of Gilmour and a lyricist for Pink Floyd, wrote on Twitter that Waters was antisemitic and "a lying, thieving, hypocritical, tax-avoiding, lip-synching, misogynistic, sick-with-envy megalomaniac". Gilmour responded to the tweet on Twitter: "Every word demonstrably true." Waters released a statement on Twitter, saying he was aware of the "incendiary and wildly inaccurate" comments from Samson and was "taking advice as to his position". 

In the same month, Waters announced that he had recorded a new version of The Dark Side of the Moon, scheduled for release later in the year. It features spoken-word sections and no guitar solos, to "bring out the heart and soul of the album musically and spiritually". In an interview with the Daily Telegraph, Waters insisted that while the other members of Pink Floyd had contributed to the original album, "It's my project and I wrote it ... Let’s get rid of all this 'we' crap!" He said the other members could not write songs, had "nothing to say" and were "not artists".

Politics

Israeli–Palestinian conflict and allegations of antisemitism 
Waters supports Palestine in the Israeli–Palestinian conflict. He is a supporter of Boycott, Divestment and Sanctions (BDS), a campaign for an international cultural boycott of Israel. Waters first saw the Israeli West Bank barrier in 2006, at the request of Palestinian supporters, when he was scheduled to perform in Tel Aviv. He subsequently moved a Tel Aviv concert to Neve Shalom, and has spoken out about the barrier.

In 2013, Rabbi Abraham Cooper, the associate dean of the Jewish human rights organisation the Simon Wiesenthal Center, accused Waters of antisemitism for including a giant pig balloon bearing a Star of David in his concerts. Waters responded that it was one of several religious and political symbols in the show and not an attempt to single out Judaism as an evil force. Later that year, Waters compared the Israeli treatment of Palestinians to Nazi Germany, saying: "The parallels with what went on in the 1930s in Germany are so crushingly obvious." He said the reason why few celebrities had joined the BDS movement in the United States was because "the Jewish lobby is extraordinary powerful here and particularly in the industry that I work in, the music industry". 

Following the remarks, the Anti-Defamation League concluded that Waters was antisemitic. The American rabbi Shmuley Boteach responded to Waters in the New York Observer: "That you would have the audacity to compare Jews to monsters who murdered them shows you have no decency, you have no heart, you have no soul." Speaking in New York afterwards, Waters said supporters of Israel often attack critics as antisemitic as a "diversionary tactic".

In 2015, Waters published an open letter in Salon criticising the rock band Bon Jovi for performing in Tel Aviv. In 2017, he urged Radiohead to cancel a concert there, signing a letter with 50 others, and was co-signatory on an open letter asking Nick Cave to cancel his. Neither Radiohead nor Cave cancelled their concerts. Waters narrated the 2016 documentary The Occupation of the American Mind: Israel's Public Relations War in the United States about the methods used by Israel to shape American public opinion. 

In a 2017 interview with Omar Barghouti, Waters again likened Israel's public diplomacy to Nazi Germany: "The thing about propaganda – again, it’s not hard to go back to Goebbels or the 1930s. You understand the tactic is to tell the big lie as often as possible over and over and over and over again. And people believe it." In 2017, the writer Ian Halperin produced a documentary, Wish You Weren't Here, accusing Waters of antisemitism and "erecting the very walls that hinder peace in the region and fuel hatred".

In 2020, Major League Baseball stopped advertising Waters' This Is Not a Drill concerts after receiving criticism from Jewish advocacy groups. Later that year, Waters said the American Jewish businessman and Republican Party donor Sheldon Adelson was a "puppet master" controlling American politics. He said that Adelson believed that "only Jewish people are completely human ... I’m not saying Jewish people believe this. I am saying that he does, and he is pulling the strings." In the same interview, Waters said that the murder of George Floyd was carried out with a technique developed by the Israeli Defence Forces. He said the Americans had studied the technique to learn "how to murder the blacks because they have seen how efficient the Israelis have been at murdering Palestinians in the occupied territories by using those techniques ... The Israelis are proud of it." The comments were criticised as antisemitic. 

On 25 February 2023, the German city of Frankfurt cancelled one of Waters' scheduled shows, calling him one of the "most widely-known antisemites", citing his support for BDS, the imagery at his shows, and talks with the militant group Hamas. The move was supported by the Central Council of Jews in Germany and the Frankfurt Jewish Community. Waters enlisted a German law firm to resist any further concert cancellations, and released a statement denying the accusations and asserting that the cancellation could have "serious, far-reaching consequences for artists and activists all over the world".

Russian invasion of Ukraine

A week before the 2022 Russian invasion of Ukraine, Waters told an RT interviewer that the talk of an attack was "bullshit" and propaganda demonising Russia. Waters said the US president, Joe Biden, was "fuelling the fire in the Ukraine ... that is a huge crime," and asked why the US does not encourage Ukraine "to negotiate, obviating the need for this horrific, horrendous war". The interviewer accused Waters of putting the responsibility on the country that was invaded, to which Waters said that Russia was responding to NATO provocations: "This war is basically about the action and reaction of NATO pushing right up to the Russian border – which they promised they wouldn’t do when Gorbachev negotiated the withdrawal of the U.S.S.R. from the whole of Eastern Europe." In another interview, Waters said the invasion of Ukraine was "probably the most provoked invasion ever" and refused to "see Russia from the current Russo-phobic perspective".

On 5 September 2022, the day after Olena Zelenska, the First Lady of Ukraine, appeared on the BBC, Waters published an open letter to her. He argued that the West should not support Ukraine with weapons, and that the West, led by the US, was interested in prolonging the war. He urged her husband to end the war based on the Minsk agreements. Waters's concerts in Poland were cancelled following the comments. 

In February 2023, at Russia's request, Waters gave a speech to the United Nations Security Council. He condemned Russia's invasion "in the strongest possible terms", but said it was "not unprovoked" and that he also "condemned the provocateurs in the strongest possible terms". The speech drew criticism from American, Ukrainian and Albanian diplomats, but praise from Russia’s deputy UN ambassador, Dmitry Polyanskiy.

Other views

After the 2004 Indian Ocean earthquake and subsequent tsunami disaster, Waters performed "Wish You Were Here" with Eric Clapton during a benefit concert on the American network NBC. He criticised the Hunting Act of 2004 and supported the Countryside Alliance, but explained he was defending the right to hunt rather than supporting the activity himself. Waters explained that whether he supported hunting or not, it was important to defend it as a right.

In 2007, Waters became a spokesman for Millennium Promise, a non-profit organisation fighting poverty and malaria. That July, he participated in the American leg of the Live Earth concert, aimed at raising awareness about global climate change. In 2015, Waters said that socialism was "a good thing", and called for socialised healthcare in the United States.

Waters is supportive of veterans, which he partly attributes to the death of his father in World War II. He allocates a block of tickets for veterans at his shows. For a few years he performed with a group of wounded veterans that was arranged through the United States National Military Medical Center. In 2012, he led a benefit for United States military veterans, Stand Up for Heroes, and invited a group of combat-wounded veterans, MusiCorps, to perform with him.

Waters opposed Brexit (the UK leaving the European Union). Following the June 2016 referendum which resulted in leaving the EU, he said: "I thought we were better than that. I was wrong." He criticised the US president Donald Trump and his policies. In 2017, Waters condemned Trump's plan to build a wall separating the US and Mexico, drawing parallels to The Wall.

In 2018, Waters included Brazilian far-right presidential candidate Jair Bolsonaro in a list of "neo-fascists" displayed on a big screen at his concert in São Paulo which drew mixed responses from the crowd. In a concert in Rio de Janeiro that October, he acknowledged the murdered Brazilian councilwoman Marielle Franco and brought her daughter, sister and widow on stage.

In 2019, Waters spoke at a rally outside London's Home Office calling for the release of the WikiLeaks founder Julian Assange, and dedicated a performance of "Wish You Were Here" to him. The following year, he spoke at a rally in support of Assange outside parliament in London.

Waters supports Steven Donziger, an American lawyer embroiled in environmental litigation against Chevron corporation, and has funded some of Donziger's legal fees. He endorsed the Labour Party leader, Jeremy Corbyn, in the 2019 UK general election, describing him as a "beacon of hope".

During his 2022 This Is Not a Drill shows, every US president from Ronald Reagan to Donald Trump was labelled a war criminal and a message was displayed that Joe Biden was "just getting started". In August 2022, Waters said that Taiwan was part of China, and that this had been "absolutely accepted by the whole of the international community since 1948".

Artistry

Waters's primary instrument in Pink Floyd was the bass guitar. However, he said in 1992 that he was "never a bass player" and was "not interested in playing instruments and I never have been". Gilmour said that Waters used a "limited" and "very simple" bass style and had not been interested in improving, and that Gilmour had played many of the bass parts on Pink Floyd records. According to Mason in 2018, Waters feels that "everything should be judged on the writing rather than the playing".

Waters briefly played a Höfner bass but replaced it with a Rickenbacker RM-1999/4001S. In 1970, it was stolen along with the rest of Pink Floyd's equipment in New Orleans. He began using Fender Precision Basses in 1968, originally alongside the Rickenbacker 4001, and then exclusively after the Rickenbacker was lost in 1970. First seen at a concert in Hyde Park, London, in July 1970, the black P-Bass was rarely used until April 1972, when it became his main stage guitar. On 2 October 2010, it became the basis for a Fender Artist Signature model. Waters endorses Rotosound Jazz Bass 77 flat-wound strings. He has used Selmer, WEM, Hiwatt, and Ashdown amplifiers but used Ampeg for later tours. He has employed delay, tremolo, chorus, stereo panning and phaser effects in his bass playing.

Waters experimented with the EMS Synthi A and VCS 3 synthesisers on Pink Floyd pieces such as "On the Run", "Welcome to the Machine", and "In the Flesh?" He played electric and acoustic guitar on Pink Floyd tracks using Fender, Martin, Ovation and Washburn guitars. He played electric guitar on the Pink Floyd song "Sheep", from Animals, and acoustic guitar on several Pink Floyd recordings, such as "Pigs on the Wing 1 & 2", also from Animals, "Southampton Dock" from The Final Cut, and on "Mother" from The Wall. A Binson Echorec 2 echo effect was used on his bass lead track "One of These Days". Waters plays trumpet during concert performances of "Outside the Wall".

Personal life 
In 1969, Waters married his childhood sweetheart Judith Trim, a potter. She was featured on the gatefold sleeve of the original release of the Pink Floyd album Ummagumma, but excised from CD reissues. They had no children and divorced in 1975. Trim died in 2001. In 1976, Waters married Lady Carolyne Christie, the niece of the 3rd Marquess of Zetland. They had a son, Harry Waters, a musician who has played keyboards with his father's touring band since 2002, and a daughter, India Waters, who has worked as a model. Christie and Waters divorced in 1992. 

In 1993, Waters married Priscilla Phillips. They had a son, Jack Fletcher. Their marriage ended in 2001. In 2004, Waters became engaged to the actress and filmmaker Laurie Durning; they married on 14 January 2012 and filed for divorce in September 2015. Waters married his fifth wife, his former chauffeur, Kamilah Chavis, in October 2021. 

Waters has homes in Long Island and Hampshire. He is an atheist.

Discography

Main solo albums
 The Pros and Cons of Hitch Hiking (1984)
 Radio K.A.O.S. (1987)
 Amused to Death (1992)
 Is This the Life We Really Want? (2017)

Other work
 Music from The Body [with Ron Geesin] (1970)
 Ça Ira (2005)
 Pros and Cons (The interviews) (2015)
 Igor Stravinsky's The Soldier's Tale (2018)
 The Lockdown Sessions (2022)

Tours

 The Pros and Cons of Hitch Hiking (1984–1985)
 K.A.O.S. On the Road (1987)
 In the Flesh (1999–2002)
 The Dark Side of the Moon Live (2006–2008)
 The Wall Live (2010–2013)
 Us + Them Tour (2017–2018)
 This Is Not a Drill (2022–2023)

Live band members

Current members 

 Roger Waters – lead vocals, bass guitar, rhythm guitars, piano (1984–present)
 Jon Carin – piano, keyboards, programming, lap steel guitar, rhythm guitars, vocals  (1999–2000, 2006–present)
 Dave Kilminster – lead guitars, talk box, vocals  (2006–present); additional bass guitar (2006–2013)
 Gus Seyffert – rhythm guitars, bass guitar, backing vocals (2017–present)
 Jonathan Wilson – lead and rhythm guitars, vocals (2017–present)
 Joey Waronker – drums, percussion (2017–present)
 Robert Walter – organ, keyboards (2022–present)
 Shanay Johnson – backing vocals (2022–present)
 Amanda Belair – backing vocals (2022–present)
 Seamus Blake – saxophone (2022–present)

Former members 

 Eric Clapton – lead guitar, backing vocals (1984)
 Tim Renwick – rhythm guitar, bass guitar (1984)
 Mel Collins – saxophone (1984–1987, 2000)
 Michael Kamen – keyboards (1984–1985)
 Chris Stainton – Hammond organ, bass guitar (1984)
 Katie Kissoon – vocals, percussion (1984–1987, 1991, 1999–2007)
 Doreen Chanter – backing vocals (1984–1987, 1991)
 Andy Newmark – drums (1984–1985)
 Jay Stapley – lead guitar, backing vocals (1985–1987)
 Andy Fairweather-Low – rhythm guitar, bass guitar, backing vocals (1985–2007)
 Paul Carrack – keyboards, vocals (1987)
 Graham Broad – drums, percussion (1987–2016)
 Rick Di Fonzo – lead guitars (1990)
 Snowy White – lead and rhythm guitars (1990–2016)
 Peter Wood – organ, keyboards, synthesizers (1990–1991)
 Nick Glennie-Smith – keyboards, organ, synthesizers (1990)
 Stan Farber – backing vocals, percussion (1990)
 Joe Chemay – backing vocals (1990)
 Jim Haas – backing vocals, percussion (1990)
 John Joyce – backing vocals (1990, 2010–2013)
 Patrick Leonard – keyboards (1991)
 Tony Levin – bass guitar (1991)
 Doyle Bramhall II – vocals, lead guitar (1999–2000)
 Andy Wallace – Hammond organ, keyboards, backing vocals (1999–2002)
 P. P. Arnold – vocals, percussion (1999–2008)
 Susannah Melvoin – backing vocals, percussion (1999–2000)
 Norbert Stachel – saxophone, penny whistle (2000, 2002)
 Chester Kamen – vocals, lead guitar & rhythm (2002); rhythm guitar, bass guitar, backing vocals (2008)
 Harry Waters – keyboards, acoustic guitar (2002); Hammond organ, piano, synthesiser (2006–2008)
 Linda Lewis – backing vocals, percussion (2002)
 Carol Kenyon – vocals, percussion (2002)
 Sylvia Mason-James – backing vocals, percussion (2008)
 G. E. Smith – rhythm and lead guitars, bass guitar, backing vocals (2010–2016)
 Robbie Wyckoff – lead and backing vocals, percussion (2010–2016)
 Kipp Lennon – backing vocals, percussion (2010–2013)
 Mark Lennon – backing vocals, percussion (2010–2013)
 Pat Lennon – backing vocals, percussion (2010–2013)
 My Morning Jacket – instrumentation (2015)
 Drew Erickson – Hammond organ, piano, keyboards (2017)
 Jess Wolfe – vocals, percussion (2015–2021)
 Holly Laessig – vocals, percussion (2015–2021)
 Ian Ritchie – saxophone, EWI, bass guitar (2006–2008, 2017–2021)
 Bo Koster – Hammond organ, piano, keyboards (2017–2021)

Guests 

 Clare Torry – vocals (1987)
 Scorpions (1990)
 Ute Lemper – vocals (1990)
 Cyndi Lauper – percussion, vocals (1990)
 Thomas Dolby – keytar, vocals (1990)
 Sinéad O'Connor – vocals (1990)
 Rick Danko – vocals (1990)
 Levon Helm – vocals (1990)
 Garth Hudson – accordion, soprano saxophone (1990)
 The Hooters (1990)
 Joni Mitchell – vocals (1990)
 James Galway – flute (1990)
 Bryan Adams – guitar, vocals (1990)
 Jerry Hall – vocals (1990)
 Paul Carrack – vocals (1990)
 Van Morrison – vocals (1990)
 Tim Curry – vocals (1990)
 Marianne Faithfull – vocals (1990)
 Albert Finney – vocals (1990)
 Bruce Hornsby – vocals, keyboard (1991)
 Don Henley – vocals (1992)
 Mike MacArthur – saxophone (2000)
 Ed Calle – saxophone (2000)
 Wayne Jackson – trumpet (2000)
 Andrew Love – saxophone (2000)
 Tim Gordon – saxophone (2000)
 Shelley Carroll – saxophone (2000)
 Don Menza – saxophone (2000)
 Steve Tavaglione – saxophone (2000)
 Norbert Stachel – saxophone (2000)
 Eric Walton – saxophone (2000)
 Mark Harris – saxophone (2000)
 Steve Eisen – saxophone (2000)
 Mel Collins – saxophone (2000)
 David Gilmour – vocals, guitar, mandolin (2011)
 Nick Mason – drums, percussion (2007), tambourine (2011)
 Eddie Vedder – vocals (2012)
 Sara Watkins – vocals, fiddle (2015)
 Amy Helm – vocals (2015)

Timeline

References

General and cited sources

Further reading

External links

 
 
 

 
1943 births
20th-century atheists
20th-century English male singers
20th-century English singers
21st-century atheists
21st-century English male singers
21st-century English singers
Alumni of the Regent Street Polytechnic
BAFTA winners (people)
Capitol Records artists
Columbia Records artists
English anti-war activists
English atheists
English experimental musicians
English male classical composers
English male singer-songwriters
English opera composers
English record producers
English rock bass guitarists
English rock guitarists
English rock singers
English socialists
European democratic socialists
Harvest Records artists
Living people
Male bass guitarists
Male opera composers
Musicians from Cambridgeshire
People from Cambridge
Pink Floyd members
Progressive rock guitarists
Progressive rock musicians
Rhythm guitarists